Cordylopteryx marshalli is a species of tephritid or fruit flies in the genus Cordylopteryx of the family Tephritidae.

Distribution
Mozambique, Zimbabwe.

References

Tephritinae
Insects described in 1924
Taxa named by Mario Bezzi
Diptera of Africa